Howe Street is a hamlet in the Finchingfield civil parish of the Braintree District of Essex, England.

References

External links

Hamlets in Essex
Finchingfield